Hershel Reichman (born February 18, 1944) is an Orthodox rabbi and rosh yeshiva of Rabbi Isaac Elchanan Theological Seminary, an affiliate of Yeshiva University.

Education 

Reichman received a BA from Yeshiva University and Ph.D. in Operations Research from New York University (NYU). Reichman considers himself primarily a student of the twentieth century Talmudic genius Rabbi Joseph B. Soloveitchik.  However, Reichman officially received his rabbinical ordination (semicha) from Rabbi Moshe Feinstein, with whom he studied Jewish Law in a private tutorial.  In addition, Reichman is known for his passionate support of Religious Zionism.

Books 

Rabbi Hershel Reichman, has authored seven volumes of Reshimos Shiurim which are lucid notes and explanations of Rabbi Soloveitchik's lectures on specific sections of the Talmud. These include the Mesechtot ("Tractates") of Sukkah, Shevuot, Nedarim, Bava Kamma, Berachot and Yevamot.  The Rav gave shiur for one year on the particularly challenging tractate of Yevamot in the year of 1962–63.  Additionally, Rav Reichman is a teacher of Hasidism, and is particularly fond of the philosophy of the Shem Mishmuel.

Professorship 
Reichman became the newest member of the Rabbi Isaac Elchanan Theological Seminary faculty to occupy an endowed chair when he was invested by President Richard M. Joel as the Bronka Weintraub Professor of Talmud on September 18, 2006 in the Harry Fischel Beit Midrash of Zysman Hall on the Wilf Campus. Reichman also gives a weekly shiur at Rambam Mesivta in Lawrence, NY.

Family 
Reichman's father was born in Belz, Poland to a family of Belzer Hasidim. After World War II, Reichman's grandfather served as an emissary of the Belzer Rebbe, Rabbi Aharon Rokeach.

One of Rabbi Reichman's sons, Rabbi Zev Reichman, is a teacher at the Mechinah program (James Striar School of General Jewish Studies) at Yeshiva University. The younger Reichman has written a book about Hasidic thought called Flames of Faith: An Introduction to Chassidic Thought, adapted from the Torah classes of Rabbi Moshe Wolfson, and has translated the book Haser Ka'as Milibecha, under the title Remove Anger from Your Heart.

Another of Rabbi Reichman's sons, Rabbi Moshe Nechemia Reichman, is a senior Ra"m of Yeshivat Torat Shraga in Israel.

Reichman resides in Washington Heights, New York.

References

External links 
 Rabbi Reichman's shiurim at yutorah.org
 Rabbi Reichman's shiurim at Naaleh

American Modern Orthodox rabbis
Yeshiva University rosh yeshivas
Living people
1944 births